Miles Davis: Birth of the Cool is a 2019 American documentary film about Miles Davis, directed by Stanley Nelson Jr.

The film was made for the PBS American Masters television series and premiered at the 2019 Sundance Film Festival. It uses interviews that Nelson has done with people who knew Davis, and with scholars, as well as still photographs and film clips. The text of the voice-over narration (performed by Carl Lumbly) is entirely by Davis.

The film won two Emmy Awards in 2021 for outstanding arts and culture documentary and outstanding sound. It was also nominated for Best Music Film at the 62nd Annual Grammy Awards in 2019, but lost to Beyoncé's Homecoming.

Cast

See also
List of American Masters episodes

References

External links

2019 documentary films
2010s biographical films
Miles Davis
American documentary films
American biographical films
2010s English-language films
African-American films
Documentary films about African Americans
Jazz films
Documentary films about jazz music and musicians
2010s American films